The Amsterdam Internet Exchange (AMS-IX) is an Internet exchange point based in Amsterdam, in the Netherlands. Established in the early 1990s, AMS-IX is a non-profit, neutral and independent peering point.

History

In February 1994, a layer 2 shared infrastructure, used between academic institutes, was connected with CERN to exchange traffic. Other Internet service providers were allowed to connect and the name AMS-IX was first used. In 1997, the AMS-IX Association was founded by twenty of the connected Internet service providers and carriers.

In 2002, the Neutral Internet Exchange was founded as an alternative or backup for the Amsterdam Internet Exchange.

, AMS-IX connected 396 members on 684 ports. The all-time peak of incoming traffic was 1.513 Tbit/s and of outgoing traffic 1.512 Tbit/s compared to 0.833 Tbit/s average incoming and outgoing, in January 2012. In November 2016, AMS-IX broke through the 5 Tbit/s ceiling.

The total amount of data transferred by month was (Avg. incoming and outgoing) 75,940 TB in November 2008.  By April 2009, it had grown to 124,550 TB, 64% more traffic in a 5-month period.

These traffic speeds make the Amsterdam Internet Exchange the second largest Internet exchange in the world, when measured by number of connected members and by Internet traffic, placing it second to the Deutscher Commercial Internet Exchange (traffic).

In September 2013, the board voted to create a legal framework to facilitate an expansion into the United States. An AMS-IX press release said that:  SURFnet, a member of the exchange, had expressed its objection to the proposal, citing the possibility that such interception would be demanded.
AMS-IX has increased its Internet traffic from about 5 Tbps in March 2020 to about 7 Tbps in March 2021.

Co-locations
AMS-IX members are able to connect at 12 locations, all located within the greater Amsterdam area:
 Digital Realty (formerly Telecity AMS4)
 Equinix AM1/2 (South East)
 Equinix AM3 (Science Park)
 Equinix AM5 (formerly TeleCity AMS5)
 Equinix AM6 (formerly TeleCity AMS6)
 Equinix AM7 (formerly TeleCity AMS2)
 euNetworks (Amsterdam Amstel Business Park)
 Evoswitch (Haarlem)
 GlobalSwitch (Slotervaart)
 Interxion (Schiphol Rijk)
 Interxion Science Park (former Vancis)
 NIKHEF (Science Park Amsterdam)

Third-party network transport links also offer access to AMS-IX peering VLAN via "Reseller Program". Under the program, reseller could arrange one physical connection toward AMS-IX platform (now solely a 10G connection, but in prospect of going to 100G), and multiplexes "virtual-link" of other parties that connect to AMS-IX peering VLAN.

Network
The AMS-IX platform is continually evolving due to its rapid growth in traffic and number of connected member ports. Up until the end of 2009, it was using a redundant hub-spoke architecture using a core switch and multiple edge switches. This double-star topology had the advantage of being able to perform maintenance on the network without any impact on customer traffic, and to anticipate on fiber and equipment problems by (automatically) switching to the backup topology as soon as a failure in one of the active components occurs. The active switching topology star is determined by means of the VSRP protocol. This topology is AMS-IX version 3.

However, since 2009; AMS-IX platform has migrated from a pure Layer2 network to a VPLS/MPLS network (using Brocade hardware) in order to cope with future growth (this is AMS-IX version 4).

AMS-IX members connect to the platform with 1, 10, 100 Gbit/s Ethernet connections, or using multiple gigabit or 10 gigabit aggregated ports, utilizing the 802.3ad standard. Gigabit Ethernet and lower speed ports are directly connected to Brocade - Foundry Networks BigIron 15000 or RX-8 network switches. 10 gigabit member ports are connected to Glimmerglass Systems photonic switches which maintain an optical connection to the stub switch on the currently active side of the network, following the VSRP protocol. For each 10-gigabit port there is an active and a backup stub switch, for which BigIron RX-8, RX-16 or NetIron MLX-16 switches are used. The core consists of two Brocade NetIron MLX-32 switches, to which all edge switches are connected using 10 gigabit aggregated connections and WDM technology.

With the new VPLS/MPLS setup; the BigIron RX and legacy BigIron 15000 are no longer in-use. AMS-IX has migrated all the hardware to the MPLS-capable MLX platform. Stub switch is either MLX-8, MLX-16 or MLX-32.

Since May 2011, AMS-IX engineers have started testing 100GE along with LimeLight Network.

See also
 List of Internet exchange points
Netherlands Internet Exchange (NL-ix)

References

External links 

1994 establishments in the Netherlands
1997 establishments in the Netherlands
Economy of Amsterdam
Internet in the Netherlands
Internet exchange points in the Netherlands